Kiely Alexis Williams (born July 9, 1986) is an American singer, dancer and actress. She is known for her membership in the girl groups 3LW, the Cheetah Girls and BluPrint.

Career

1999–2002: Career beginnings and 3LW
In 1999, Williams along with Adrienne Bailon and Naturi Naughton formed the girl group 3LW. The initial formation of the 3LW was pulled together by Williams' mother, who also managed the group. 3LW was signed to Epic Records and work on their debut album began in 1999. Their first single, "No More (Baby I'ma Do Right)", was released in the fall of 2000. "No More" was a chart success, and was followed by "Playas Gon' Play" in early 2001.

The group's self-titled debut album, 3LW was released on December 5, 2000. The album went on to be certified platinum by the RIAA, selling 1.3 million copies in the US.
In the summer of 2001, the group embarked on the MTV Total Request Live tour along with Destiny's Child, Dream, Nelly, Eve, and Jessica Simpson. In 2001, 3LW recorded a song with various artists including Michael Jackson, Usher, Beyoncé, Luther Vandross, Celine Dion and Mariah Carey in response to the 9/11 attacks called "What More Can I Give". In late 2001 they collaborated with Lil' Romeo and Nick Cannon for "Parents Just Don't Understand" on the Jimmy Neutron, Boy Genius soundtrack. Also in 2001, Williams appeared on an episode of Taina called "Blue Mascara" by playing her character named Lia where the main titled character (Christina Vidal) is overjoyed to join the most popular all-female singing group at school until they tell her to ditch her best friend named Renee (Khalia Adams). Williams played herself in an episode of The Jersey called "Speaking of Coleman" where after freaking out at a debate competition, Coleman Galloway (played by Jermaine Williams) gets a lesson in handling stage fright as he uses a magical jersey by jumping into her body backstage during a half-time show.

3LW spent the first half of 2002 in the studio, recording an album tentatively titled Same Game, Different Rules. The album and its intended lead single "Uh Oh" were presented to the label, who felt it did not have enough urban radio appeal. The tracks from Same Game, Different Rules were leaked to the Internet in MP3 format, and Epic considered dropping the girls. A fan support campaign for 3LW named 'Never Let Go of 3LW' after their song "Never Let Go" spread to the radio, and the act was retained, despite the album loss. Recording a new set of tracks, the group returned in the summer of 2002 with the P. Diddy-produced single "I Do (Wanna Get Close To You)", featuring Loon. That same summer, the group performed a concert special on Nickelodeon titled Live on Sunset. By August, the group was set to release its newest LP, A Girl Can Mack, when member Naughton had left the group for good after heated arguments. The album's release date was pushed back a month, but sales were still disappointing debuting at No. 15 on the Billboard 200 with a disappointing 53,000 copies sold in the first week. Naughton alleged that she had a number of conflicts and arguments with Bailon, Williams, and their management.

2003–2008: The Cheetah Girls, 3LW disbandment, and acting career
Williams and Bailon continued as a duo while using the "3LW" name, causing the press to jokingly refer to them as "2LW". According to a cover story for the October 2002 issue of Sister 2 Sister magazine, Kiely & Adrienne said they received death threats and that they had to beef up security. The departure of Naturi greatly affected the group's popularity and album sales. After the second single released from the album, "Neva Get Enuf", underperformed, auditions were held across the country for a new third member. Jessica Benson made the cut and joined 3LW in early 2003. Without Jessica, the group might have had to split due to "bankruptcy". Jessica's first performance was on Live with Regis & Kelly, followed by a performance on Soul Train. In fall 2003, 3LW departed from Epic, signing with Jermaine Dupri's So So Def label. The group then began working on their fourth studio album.

While working on the album, both Bailon and Williams signed on to star in the Disney Channel film The Cheetah Girls. They starred as two of four members of a female girl group named after the film, with Raven-Symoné and Sabrina Bryan portraying the final two members. The movie was released in August 2003 and was a ratings success. The Cheetah Girls soundtrack debuted at No. 33 on the Billboard 200 and was later certified 2× Platinum by the RIAA. Walt Disney Records soon created a real-life girl group, composed of Adrienne, Kiely, and Sabrina. Raven was offered a spot in the group but declined, opting to focus on her solo career and her television series That's So Raven. The trio began working on their first studio album, later revealed to be a Christmas album. The album, titled Cheetah-licious Christmas, was released that year, and they soon left Walt Disney and signed to Hollywood Records in 2006.

The Cheetah Girls later returned to film the sequel The Cheetah Girls 2. Though she was absent from the main group, Raven-Symoné did return to film the sequel. The movie premiered on August 25, 2006, and brought a total of 8.1 million viewers, becoming the highest rated Disney Channel original movie and beating the premiere of the first of the High School Musical films. The soundtrack to the movie released on August 15, 2006, and debuted at No. 5 on the charts and was certified platinum by the end of the year. The Cheetah Girls began work on their second studio album in January 2006. "We'll be making a real album, not a soundtrack", Bailon said. Their debut album TCG was released on September 25, 2007, and featured the single "Fuego", which charted on Hot Dance Club Play's chart and had its video played in heavy rotation on Disney Channel and MTV Tr3s.

Though they were heavily involved with the Cheetah Girls, Kiely and Adrienne were still members of 3LW, though progress on their fourth album had halted due to their work with the Cheetah Girls. The group's fourth studio album was originally called Phoenix Rising, but was renamed Point of No Return. The lead-off single, "Feelin' You", was added on radio stations July 12, 2006. The album was supposed to be released later that year but was pushed back to a 2007 release because of Adrienne and Kiely's involvement with Disney's Cheetah Girls franchise, and eventually fell off the release schedule. The album delays were caused by image conflicts between both groups. As a result, the album was never released. In early 2007, Bailon stated in Girls Life magazine that 3LW was on hold because of the Cheetah Girls project. However, rumors were finally put to rest by Bailon in an interview with Jonathon Jackson in 2008 when Bailon confirmed that 3LW officially disbanded after they were removed from the So So Def roster. Bailon and Williams decided to then pursue the Cheetah Girls franchise full-time.

In 2008, work on the third film in the Cheetah Girls franchise, titled The Cheetah Girls: One World was in works. According to Disney, the plot would involve the Cheetah Girls going to India to star in a Bollywood production. Like The Cheetah Girls 2, it was filmed on location in a foreign country. In an interview, Bailon stated the movie would film for a three-month period, in India, and that she had been doing research for the film. However, Raven-Symoné later confirmed that she would not return for this film. The movie premiered to over 6.2 million viewers, and reached 7 million viewers in its final half-hour. This still failed to meet the ratings of the first two and was the series' lowest-rated premiere. In the UK, its premiere night scored 412,000 on Disney Channel UK, making it No. 1 of the week, and received 182,000 on Disney Channel UK +1, also No. 1 on that channel for the week, totalling 594,000. Williams recorded a solo song for the film's soundtrack album, entitled "Circle Game".

In November 2008, Williams confirmed in an interview with In Touch Weekly that the group had officially disbanded to pursue solo careers in both acting and singing. Bailon and Bryan later confirmed the statement. As of 2012, the group is still disbanded, though all three members have stated they are "open" to working with one another again.

2009–2013: Continued acting and solo music

During the summer of 2008, Williams began quietly working on a solo singing project separate from work in the Cheetah Girls. Following the breakup of the Cheetah Girls, she filmed the music video for her song "Make Me a Drink" in New York City in November 2008.

In August 2009, a preview of what was expected to be Williams debut solo single "Make Me a Drink" (which was written by Young Money Entertainment recording artist Shanell) appeared on YouTube, "Make Me A Drink"  but never officially released, and leaked to the internet in late 2018.

She completed a starring role in the independent film Elle: A Modern Cinderella Tale. In late 2009, Kiely began work on Stomp the Yard: Homecoming. The role of Kandi Kane, in Elle, required Kiely to record several songs for the film and the accompanying soundtrack and learn extensive choreography. Stomp the Yard: Homecoming and Elle were both released in 2010.

On October 28, 2009, Williams official website released the instrumentals of her first single, titled "Spectacular", a song written by Williams and produced by Mike City. The single was released exclusively to club DJs the first week on November. The single was released to the public on January 15, 2010, and the accompanying music video was released to YouTube on April 5, 2010, to mostly negative reviews. The video caused so much controversy that Williams opted to respond to its negative YouTube reviews on her website as well as on The Joy Behar Show on HLN.

2014-2020: Internet series, creative direction
Kiely Williams and Sabrina Bryan co-starred on the web series "Dinner With Friends", "March Moms", and "Bad Sex With Good People". Following the finale of Bad Sex with Good People, Williams moved behind the scenes to work as a creative director and in new artist development.

2021-Present: BET Presents: The Encore, BluPrint
In 2021, she starred in BET Presents: The Encore which documented the formation of R&B supergroup BluPrint alongside Shamari Devoe of Blaque, and Fallon and Felisha King of Cherish. Their eponymous debut EP was released August 11, 2021.

Personal life
Williams married Brandon Cox in December 2016, in Fort Worth, Texas. Sabrina Bryan served as a bridesmaid. The couple announced they were expecting their first child in October 2017. Their child, a daughter, was born in March 2018. They welcomed their second daughter on March 29, 2022.

Discography
See also: 3LW discography and the Cheetah Girls discography

Filmography

References

External links

 
 BluPrint
 Kiely Williams on YouTube

1986 births
Living people
Actresses from Alexandria, Virginia
African-American actresses
African-American female dancers
African-American women rappers
African-American women singer-songwriters
American contemporary R&B singers
American child actresses
American child singers
American female dancers
American film actresses
American television actresses
American women pop singers
American women rappers
American women singer-songwriters
Dancers from Virginia
Singer-songwriters from Virginia
Musicians from Alexandria, Virginia
The Cheetah Girls members
Walt Disney Records artists
21st-century American actresses
21st-century American rappers
20th-century American singers
21st-century American singers
20th-century American women singers
21st-century American women singers
3LW members
21st-century women rappers